Florida Probe is a type of probing and charting software used by dentists and dental hygienists to detect and diagnose periodontal disease. It may also help to track down the progress and results of trial treatments performed on controlled study patients.

History
The software was developed by Florida Probe Corporation and released for the first time in 1987. It was created as a project for the University of Florida.

System components
The Florida Probe system consists of a computerized USB probe, a footswitch, a displacement transducer with digital readout, as well as the software proper.

Software features
 Customizable voice feedback (in different languages and genders)
 Robust SQL Express based Database Engine
 Tooth history and visits comparison charts
 Risk assessment, Summary reports, Plaque chart, Patient education videos
 Diagnosis Forms with Epad Signature support
 It can collect: Pocket Depth, Recession, Furcation, Plaque, Mobility, MGJ, Bleeding, Pus and more
 Ability to export all data to Excel format file
 Offline Mode
 Global Settings that apply to all workstations
 A complete patient record can be exported and imported using an encapsulated .FPC file
 Ability to link with over 40 different Practice Management Software providers, including Dentrix, DSN Software, Eaglesoft, Practiceworks, and Softdent

See also
 Charting application
 Periodontal probe
 Medical practice management software

References

External links
 Official website

Dental software